State Route 233 (SR 233) is an east–west state highway in the southeastern portion of Ohio, a U.S. state. The western terminus of State Route 233 is at a signalized intersection in Oak Hill where it meets the duplex of State Route 93 and State Route 279.

Formed in the middle of the 1920s, State Route 233's path takes it through southeastern Jackson County and western Gallia County.  The entire length of State Route 233 is included as a part of the Welsh Byway, an officially designated  National Scenic Byway.

Route description
State Route 233 passes through portions of the counties of Jackson and Gallia along its journey.  The route is not included as a part of the National Highway System, a network of highways deemed most imperative for the nation's economy, mobility and defense.

History
State Route 233 was first designated in 1924 along the routing that it maintains to this day through Jackson and Gallia Counties.  No changes of major significance have taken place to this state highway since its designation.

Major intersections

References

External links

Welsh Scenic Byway

233
Scenic byways in Ohio
Transportation in Jackson County, Ohio
Transportation in Gallia County, Ohio